DRA or Dra may refer to:

Places 
 Democratic Republic of Afghanistan, 1978-1987
 Desert Rock Airport (IATA airport code DRA), Mercury, Nevada, USA
 Draco (constellation) (abbreviated Dra)

Organizations 
 Defence Research Agency, former UK body
 Delta Regional Authority, for the Mississippi River Delta Region, US
 Deutscher Reichsausschuss für Leibesübungen, later Nationalsozialistischer Reichsbund für Leibesübungen, a former German sports organization
 Deutsches Rundfunkarchiv, the German Broadcasting Archive

Science and technology 
 Dielectric resonator antenna
 Dopamine receptor antagonist, first generation antipsychotics
 Dopamine releasing agent, a class of drugs
 Downregulated-in-adenoma, an anion exchanger
 Drag reducing agent, a pipeline flow improver
 Driver's reminder appliance, a UK passenger train safety device
 Dynamic Resolution Adaptation, an audio coding standard
 Dynamic Resource Allocation, an project management tool
 Dave's Redistricting App, an online web app that allows people to draw redistricting maps

Other uses 
 (Dra.), feminine-form abbreviation for Doctor (title) in some languages

See also

 
 
 
 Dras (disambiguation)